was established during the Edo period as a subroute to Nikkō Kaidō. It was built for the shōgun to use as he traveled to Nikkō Tōshō-gū. It is also referred to as the Nikkō Onarimichi and the Iwatsuki Kaidō.

Stations of the Nikkō Onari Kaidō
The six post stations of the Nikkō Onari Kaidō, with their present-day municipalities listed beside them.

Tokyo
1. Iwabuchi-juku (岩淵宿) (Kita)

Saitama Prefecture
2. Kawaguchi-juku (川口宿) (Kawaguchi)
3. Hatogaya-juku (鳩ヶ谷宿) (Kawaguchi)
4. Daimon-juku (大門宿) (Saitama)
5. Iwatsuki-juku (岩槻宿) (Iwatsuki-ku, Saitama)
6. Satte-juku (幸手宿) (Satte)

See also
Kaidō
Edo Five Routes

References

Road transport in Japan
Edo period